St Barts and The Royal London RFC ("Royal Hospitals") is the name given to the modern amalgam of two formerly distinct hospital rugby clubs each with a long history, having both been founded in the 1860s. The side is notable for its history, its longevity in the world of rugby, its once time dominance of the oldest competition in rugby, the United Hospitals Cup, as well as having produced a number of international players.

History
The history of Barts and the London Rugby Club or Royal Hospitals RFC is the combined history of two older sides, and their joint history from the point of merger:

Royal London Hospital Rugby
The London Hospital Football Club formed in 1865. Using the Morpeth Lodge as their headquarters they played their first home matches on Victoria Park in East London. They adopted the first of their three strips, that of black jerseys with a cross on a red shield on the breast. This was quickly changed to blue and white hoops. Their first success in the United Hospitals Cup came at the expense of St Bartholomew's in 1884 when they won by two goals and two touchdowns to one goal and one touchdown. This occurred three years after the latter had utterly outplayed them in the same fixture. The London was a highly regarded team on the metropolitan club circuit, playing, outside of the other hospitals, such opposition as London Welsh, Old Leysians, Saracens F.C. and Wasps amongst others by 1894. Soon after this they changed their strip to the once famous blue and white chequered pattern for which they were known for close to a century. The London made the final of the Hospitals Cup fourteen times in sixteen years leading up to World War I and even more illustrious opposition was added to their fixture list including Rosslyn Park and the Royal Indian Engineering College. So good were the London during this period that from their ranks they could boast four internationals. Like many teams of the period, the London was deeply affected by losses sustained in the Great War but recovered reasonably quickly such that by the 1930s they were taking a number of notable scalps once again. The period after World War 2 saw the arrival of Mike Floyer whose incredible devotion to the club, for which he played for many years and also served as president. In his honour an annual fixture between current students of the medical school and old boys is played, known as the Mike Floyer Memorial Day match. When the league system was introduced in the 1987/88 season, London were placed in the Eastern Counties 5, despite a fixture list that included the likes of London Welsh, Rosslyn Park and Wasps.

Barts Hospital Rugby
St Bartholomew's Hospital team formed in 1866. They won the first of their nine Hospital's Cups in 1881 against the team they would later merge with. They won by a very large margin. They were quickly established as a London club and provided international representation as early as 1881 in the form of Welsh forward Edward Treharne. When the league system was introduced, Barts were placed slightly higher than the London, into the Middlesex 2.

1995 onwards – post-merger
The teams from Royal London Hospital and St Bartholomew's Hospital merged in 1995 following the union of St Bartholomew's Hospital Medical College and the London Hospital Medical College with Queen Mary and Westfield College, now known as Queen Mary, University of London to form St Bartholomew's and the Royal London School of Medicine and Dentistry. The two Medical Schools who were once arch rivals were to come together to try to provide the highest quality Medical Education. Likewise, Barts and the London Rugby Club or Royal Hospitals RFC was formed. BLRFC until 2001 played their matches at Hale End (The London's Old Ground) and have since played at Chislehurst (Bart's Old Ground) which is now known as The Queen Mary University of London ground.
In 2012, Royal Hospitals RFC won the United Hospitals Cup, the oldest cup competition in rugby, and defended their title in 2013. In the 2013–14 season, with a record of only one loss, they were promoted to the Southern Premiership 1b league of BUCS for the first time.
In 2017, Royal Hospitals RFC won the United Hospitals Cup again with a tense 14–10 victory against Imperial Medicals at Ealing Trailfinders RFC. That season, they went undefeated to gain promotion to BUCS South Western 1a. 
Despite making the United Hospitals Cup final a further two times over the next three years, Royal Hospitals were unable to regain the Cup, until a spirited performance in 2022 saw them take the Cup home with a 22–12 victory over GKT. The victory was all the more impressive given Royal Hospitals had been trailing for 72 minutes of the match, before two tries in the dying minutes ensured a comeback win.

Team Colours
The current colours are an amalgamation of the two clubs. Barts used to play in black and white hoops (their second strip) whereas the London had settled on blue and white chequers at the beginning of the twentieth century. The club's 1st XV therefore play in black and white chequers, one of a few in the country to play in such chequered shirts. The 2nd XV play in blue and black hoops.

Competition
The team competes every year in the United Hospitals Cup with the other London Medical Schools, RUMS, Imperial Medics RFC, GKT & St Georges as well as Royal Veterinary College. The cup is the oldest rugby cup competition in the world. The trophy has been won by The Royal London on 11 occasions (the last in 1986) and by Barts 9 times (the last in 1977). Royal Hospitals RFC are the current UH cup champions for the second year in a row. This season they beat St. Georges Hospital Medical School RFC in the final and Imperial College Medical School RFC the previous year. Club's Official site – History of BLRFC

In 2008 they won the UH 7-a-side tournament, beating Imperial Medics in the final. They also compete in the British University and College Sports (BUCS) Leagues. They finished in 1st place of the BUCS Southeastern 2B Division at the end of the 2009–10 season followed by third in BUCS Southeastern 1A in 2010. As well as this they compete in the National Association of Medics' Sports 7-a-side tournament and placed 2nd, narrowly losing to Nottingham Medics in the final in 2009.

Since the merge of Barts and the London Medical School with Queen Mary, University of London, the rugby club has also participated in the Merger Cup.

Internationals
Over the years the club and its predecessor clubs have fostered in total seven international players who have played for their countries whilst being members of the hospital sides.(source for below)

The London
  Hugh Monteith (1905)
  Alexander Palmer (1909)
  Alan Adams (1910)
  William Stewart (1913–14)

former players capped whilst playing for other clubs'''
  Bruce Thomson (1953)  David Burcher (1977)  Hugh Condon (1984)St Bartholomew's
  Leonard Tosswill (1902)  Beriah Melbourne Gwynne Thomas(1919–24)  Andy Dun (1984)former players capped whilst playing for other clubs  Edward Treharne (1881–83)
  Howard Marshall (1891–93)

 Barts & The London RFC 
  Laurence Gardner (2015)

HonoursLondon HospitalEastern Counties 5 champions: 1988–89
Eastern Counties 4 champions: 1989–90Royal Hospitals'''
Middlesex 4 champions: 1995–96

References

External links
 blrugby.com
 uhrugby.com

Rugby clubs established in 1996
English rugby union teams
University and college rugby union clubs in England
Rugby union clubs in London
United Hospitals sports clubs